Aptilotella is a genus of flies belonging to the family Lesser Dung flies.

Species
A. borgmeieri Duda, 1924

References

Sphaeroceridae
Diptera of South America
Taxa named by Oswald Duda
Brachycera genera